The 1929 Montana State Bobcats football team was an American football team that represented Montana State College (later renamed Montana State University) in the Rocky Mountain Conference (RMC) during the 1929 college football season. In its second season under head coach Schubert R. Dyche, the team compiled a 6–2 record (2–1 against RMC opponents) and outscored opponents by a total of 84 to 72.

Schedule

References

Montana State
Montana State Bobcats football seasons
Montana State Bobcats football